Główczyce may refer to:

Główczyce, Opole Voivodeship, Poland
Główczyce, Pomeranian Voivodeship, Poland